William Goldwin (c.1682 – 1747 at Bristol) was an English schoolteacher and vicar who left his mark on cricket by creating the sport's earliest known work of literature. Goldwin, whose name is sometimes spelt "Goldwyn", wrote a poem of 95 competent and sometimes graceful lines of Latin hexameters on a rural cricket match. It was called In Certamen Pilae (On a Ball Game) and it was published in his Musae Juveniles in March 1706.

Little is known of Goldwin himself. He attended Eton and then graduated to King's College, Cambridge in 1700. He subsequently became a Master of Bristol Grammar School and was Vicar of St Nicholas' Church in Bristol until his death in 1747.

References

Notes

Bibliography
 
 
 
 

1680s births
1747 deaths
Bristol Grammar School
Cricket historians and writers
English cricket in the 18th century
English poets
People educated at Eton College